A Story is an album by Yoko Ono, recorded in 1974, during the "lost weekend" sessions in which John Lennon produced Walls and Bridges. It was unreleased until the 1992 box set Onobox, which featured material from A Story on disc six. It was only properly released as an individual album 23 years later in 1997, with the reissuing of Ono's back catalogue by Rykodisc. The reissue added three bonus tracks, including home demos and a live recording from the Starpeace tour.

Track listing

Bonus tracks

Track information
Many of the tracks on A Story made it onto subsequent albums in a re-recorded form:
"Loneliness" and "Tomorrow May Never Come" were included on It's Alright (I See Rainbows).
"Will You Touch Me", "Dogtown" and "She Gets Down on Her Knees" were included on Season of Glass.
"Hard Times Are Over" was included on Double Fantasy.
"It Happened" was released as a different mix as the B-side to "Walking on Thin Ice".
"Yes, I'm a Witch" was included on, and gave its title to, Yes, I'm a Witch, a remix album of songs from Ono's back catalogue.

Personnel
 Yoko Ono – vocals, backing vocals
 Ann E. Sutton, Erin Dickins, Gail Kantor, Louise Messina – backing vocals on "Heartburn Stew", "Hard Times are Over" and "Tomorrow May Never Come"
 Something Different – background vocals on "Tomorrow May Never Come"
 David Spinozza, Hugh McCracken – guitar
 Gordon Edwards – bass guitar
 Kenneth Ascher – keyboards
 Leon Pendarvis – keyboards on "She Gets Down on Her Knees"
 Arthur Jenkins Jr. – percussion
 Michael Brecker – tenor saxophone 
 Alan Rubin, Randy Brecker – trumpet
 Lew Delgatto – baritone saxophone, bass clarinet 
 George Young – flute, clarinet 
 Rick Marotta – drums

Technical
 Produced by Yoko Ono and David Spinozza
 Recorded at Record Plant, N.Y., 1974
 Ed Sprigg, Jack Douglas – recording engineers
 Ed Sprigg, Roy Cicala – mix engineers
 Kevin Herron – assistant engineer

"Anatano Te" & "Extension 33" (Rykodisc CD Bonus Demo Tracks)
 Yoko Ono – vocal and piano
 Recorded on cassette, Dakota Period

"Now or Never" (Rykodisc CD Bonus Live Track)
 Yoko Ono – vocal
 Recorded live in Budapest, 1986

Production 
 David Spinozza, Rob Stevens, Yoko Ono – producers 
 Ed Sprigg, Jack Douglas – recording
 George Marino, Rob Stevens – remastering
 Kevin Herron – engineer 
 Ed Sprigg, Roy Cicala – mixing
 Black + Copper, Cindy Nelson – design [CD Package]
 Karla Merrifield – illustration [Hand Tinting]

Release History

References

External links
 Musicians, Production : Yoko Ono – A Story (1997, CD)

1997 albums
Yoko Ono albums
Albums produced by David Spinozza
Rykodisc albums